Il Quotidiano del Friuli Venezia Giulia (English: The Daily of Friuli Venezia Giulia) was an Italian free newspaper, founded in 2011. It was read only in Friuli Venezia Giulia. The paper went defunct in 2014.

External links
 Official website 

2011 establishments in Italy
2014 disestablishments in Italy
Defunct free daily newspapers
Defunct newspapers published in Italy
Italian-language newspapers
Daily newspapers published in Italy
Publications established in 2011
Publications disestablished in 2014